The second season of Zumbo's Just Desserts premiered in Australia on November 17, 2019, on Seven Network. Ten contestants were selected to compete. The winner of this season won the grand prize of $100,000 and earns the title of "Zumbo's Just Desserts Winner".

The show is hosted by Adriano Zumbo and Rachel Khoo. On May 16, 2019, it was announced that the assistant Gigi Falanga, who appeared in the previous season, was not returning.

Competition structure
Each chapter is divided into two stages. The "Sweet Sensations task" and the "Zumbo Test".

During the first challenge, regularly with a duration of three hours, each contestant must create a dessert following the theme and rules given by the judges at the beginning. Rachel and Zumbo evaluate each of the creations, determining a winner, who gets the Dessert Of The Day. They also declare those who were safe from the second phase and the two bakers who will go to the second phase or elimination round.

The elimination round, or Zumbo Test, consists of testing the bottom bakers with original Zumbo creations, where at least one baker will go home.

Contestants

Contestant progress

 'Dessert Of The Day'
 Produce one of the favorite desserts but was not crowned 'Dessert Of The Day'
 Produce one of the weakest desserts but was not in the 'Zumbo Test'
 Won the 'Zumbo Test'
 Lost the 'Zumbo Test'
 Eliminated from the competition
 Press the 'Golden Button'
 Won the 'Zumbo Test' to earn 'Golden Ticket' as a shortcut to the Grand Final
 Lost the 'Zumbo Test' to earn the 'Golden Ticket'
 Sent to the Semi-Final
 Series winner
 Series runner up
SS: Sweet Sensations Challenge 
ZT: Zumbo Test 
DNP: Through to the Finals!

Series details

Episode 1 – Make Some Magic!
 Airdate — 17 November 2019
 Sweet Sensations — The Dessert Makers had to create a dessert that has a secret inside.
 Zumbo Test — The bottom two contestants had to recreate Zumbo's cake "I'm Not Lion".

Episode 2 – The Terrifying Tower
 Airdate — 18 November 2019
 Sweet Sensations — The Dessert Makers had to create a dessert tower at least half a meter high.
 Zumbo Test — The bottom two had to recreate the Zumbo's "Lucky 13".

{| class="wikitable plainrowheaders" style="text-align:center; font-size:90%; width:80em;"
|+ Sweet Sensations details
! Contestant
! Dessert
! Result
|-
! Kylie
| Tropical Layer Cake with Pineapple Flowers
| bgcolor="lightgreen"| Safe (DOTD)
|-
! Catherine
| 
| rowspan="6"| Safe''
|-
! Rachel
| Choux Bun Mermaid Tower with Lemon Madeleines
|-
! Jeff
| Éclair & Profiterole Tower with Nougatine
|-
! Kristie
| Chocolate & Caramel Cake Pop Tower|-
! Simon
| Éclair Tower with Layered Mocha Cake
|-
! Megan
| 
|-
! Zak
| 
| rowspan="2" bgcolor="pink"| Bottom Two(Zumbo Test)|-
! Pearly
| Lemonade Cake with Raspberry Buttercream, Confetti Blondie & Musk
|}

Episode 3 – Sundae Dream
 Airdate — 19 November 2019
 Sweet Sensations — The Dessert Makers had to create an original-refined version of a sundae.
 Zumbo Test — The bottom two had to recreate Zumbo's "Lazy Sundae".

Episode 4 – Out of This World
 Airdate — 20 November 2019
 Sweet Sensations — Each Dessert Maker had to create a space themed dessert.
 Zumbo Test — The bottom two had to recreate Zumbo's cake "Planet Zumbo".

Episode 5 – An Enchanted Party
 Airdate — 24 November 2019
 Sweet Sensations — The Dessert Makers had to make an enchanted kid's party cake.
 Zumbo Test — The bottom two had to recreate Zumbo's "Fruitina".

Episode 6 – Suspended in Time
 Airdate — 25 November 2019
 Sweet Sensations — The dessert makers had to create a dessert that looks like a moment in time. As a plot twist, the baker who finished at first his/her dessert can push the golden button, which gives 2 extra points for this stage. Jeff pushed the golden button.
 Zumbo Test — The bottom two had to recreate Zumbo's cake "About Time". 

Episode 7 – Fright Night
 Airdate — 26 November 2019
 Sweet Sensations — The dessert makers had to create a horror inspired dessert.
 Zumbo Test — The bottom three had to recreate Zumbo's "Eyes on the Mummy".

Episode 8 – Smoke and Mirrors
 Airdate — 4 December 2019
 Sweet Sensations — The dessert makers had to create a reflective mirror-like dessert. As a plot twist, just the top two qualified for the Zumbo Test.
 Zumbo Test — The top two had to recreate Zumbo's "Time for a Grilling". The winner of this stage received the Golden Ticket to the Grand Final.

 Episode 9 – Secret Garden
 Airdate — 5 December 2019
 Sweet Sensations — The dessert makers had to create a dessert that's inspired by a botanical garden.
 Zumbo Test — The dessert makers had to recreate Zumbo's "Vertical Garden". The higher scoring contestant was sent to the Grand Final, the lower scoring contestant was eliminated.

Episode 10 – Bring on the Bling
 Airdate — 5 December 2019
 Detail — Unlike former episodes, the final two took part in the Zumbo Test first and the Sweet Sensations last.
 Final Zumbo Test — The final two contestants had to recreate Zumbo's "The Sweet Smell of Success".
 Final Sweet Sensations''' — The final two had to create a dessert with a sense of luxury and bling.

References 

2019 Australian television seasons